Power Ballads may refer to:

 Power Ballads (Aqueduct album), 2003
 Power Ballads (London Elektricity album), 2005

See also 
 Power ballad
 Power Balladz
 Ballad (disambiguation)